Netherdale is a sports ground in Galashiels, Scotland.

Netherdale may also refer to

Netherdale, an obsolete name of Nidderdale, a valley in Yorkshire, England
Netherdale, an area of Galashiels, Scotland
Netherdale, Queensland, a locality in Queensland, Australia